This page provides supplementary chemical data on ethane.

Material Safety Data Sheet  

The handling of this chemical may incur notable safety precautions. It is highly recommend that you seek the Material Safety Datasheet (MSDS) for this chemical from a reliable source such as SIRI, and follow its directions.

Structure and properties

Thermodynamic properties

Vapor pressure of liquid

Table data obtained from CRC Handbook of Chemistry and Physics 44th ed.

Melting point data  
Mean value for acceptable data: −183.01 °C (90.14 K).

Sources used, from ONS Open Melting Point Collection:
 −183.33 °C
 −182.85 °C from CHERIC
 −182.78 °C
 −182.79 °C from PHYSPROP
 −183.28 °C

Values considered "outliers", not included in averaging:
 −172 °C from Oxford MSDS
 −172.15 °C

Spectral data

References

Chemical data pages
Data page
Chemical data pages cleanup